M85-HCC1 is an ultracompact dwarf galaxy with a star density 1,000,000 times that of the solar neighbourhood, lying near the galaxy Messier 85. , it is the densest galaxy known.

See also 
 List of most massive galaxies

References

See also
 M59-UCD3 (second-densest galaxy known, as of 2015)
 M60-UCD1 (another dense galaxy)

Dwarf galaxies
20150727
Coma Berenices